This is a list of named geological features on Hyperion, a moon of Saturn.

Dorsa 

There is one named dorsum (ridge) on Hyperion.

Craters 

This is a list of craters on Hyperion. Hyperionian craters are named after sun and moon gods in various mythologies.

References

External links 
 USGS: Hyperion nomenclature

Hyperion (moon)
Hyperion (moon)
Hyperion